Stefán Jónsson (born 24 April 1944) is an Icelandic former handball player who competed in the 1972 Summer Olympics.

References

1944 births
Living people
Stefan Jonsson
Stefan Jonsson
Handball players at the 1972 Summer Olympics